Louisa Piepenhagen, or Louisa Kannengiesser-Piepenhagen (11 May 1825, Prague - 4 November 1893, Prague) was a Czech landscape and genre painter in the Romantic style.

Biography 
She was the youngest of four children born to the painter, August Piepenhagen. She and her older sister, Charlotte, who also became a landscape painter, had their first art lessons with their father. From 1852 to 1854, the three of them travelled throughout Germany, France, Belgium and Switzerland. During her later years, she lived alternately in Prague, Plzeň and Vienna.

She married Hermann Kanenngiesser in Prussia in the 60s. After his death in 1876 she established her residency in Prague, she registered as the widow "Louisa Kannengiesser, née Piepenhagen".

After 1866, she exhibited regularly with the "" (Society for Promotion of the Arts). She also took another tour of Germany and exhibited several times in Vienna from 1871 to 1875. From 1876, she was established in Prague. In 1884, she made an extended visit to Charlotte in Italy.

She died without issue and is buried at Olšany Cemetery, together with Charlotte and her father.

References

External links 
 
 The Piepenhagen family plot @ SPH Adopce
 Drawings by Louisa Piepenhagen @ Patrik Šimon

1825 births
1893 deaths
19th-century Czech painters
Landscape painters
Czech women painters
Artists from Prague
19th-century women artists